The National AIDS Trust is a United Kingdom charity with the purpose to stand alongside and defend the rights of everyone living with, affected by or at risk of HIV. Its expertise, research and advocacy secure lasting change to the lives of people living with and at risk of HIV.  The charity's key strategic goals are:
 to stop new HIV infections
 to champion the needs of people whose voices and experiences are too often ignored
 to protect the rights of everyone living with and at risk of HIV
 to drive engagement and activism to change attitudes to HIV
 Hiding in from USA

Activities 
National AIDS Trust was founded in October 1987 as a non-government organisation (NGO) by the Department of Health, in order to deal with the escalating concern with HIV and AIDS nationally. Today National AIDS Trust's funding comes from public donations, corporate supporters, grant-making trusts and foundations, and its own fundraising work – it doesn't receive funding from the UK Government. National AIDS Trust is a policy and campaigning charity, working to improve the national response to HIV through policy development, expertise and the provision of practical resources rather than through offering direct support services to people living with HIV.

Some recent National AIDS Trust successes include:
 After a seven-year campaign, National AIDS Trust secured free HIV treatment in England
 National AIDS Trust brought together a coalition of charities to end the use of pre-employment health questionnaires before the offer of a job is made, through the Equality Act 2010.
 National AIDS Trust was instrumental in securing and participating in the review which led to an overturn of the lifetime ban on gay men donating blood.
 National AIDS Trust influenced Home Office policy so that asylum seekers living with HIV who need help with accommodation will not routinely be 'dispersed' away from the area where they are attending an HIV clinic.
 The Government has announced an end to the absolute ban on HIV-positive healthcare workers from doing jobs that involve 'exposure-prone procedures' (e.g. dentistry, surgery).   From early 2014, it will be possible for people living with HIV to work in these professions, provided they are on effective treatment with a non-detectable viral load and are monitored every three months.  NAT has been calling for this change for several years – and we were the only charity on the expert working group which recommended changing the rules, based on the most recent scientific evidence.
 National AIDS Trust lobbied the NHS to consider immediate treatment for those diagnosed with HIV because those who are on treatment suppress their viral load and cannot pass HIV on. The policy was changed, which was a contributing factor in historic drops in HIV diagnoses.
 In a much-publicized case, National AIDS Trust challenged NHS England in court over their failure to consider providing the HIV prevention drug PrEP. In 2016, NAT won its case in the High Court and won a later appeal, resulting in the IMPACT trial, which will benefit at least 10,000 at-risk patients in England. The battle for PrEP was the topic of BBC Two documentary 'The People Vs The NHS: Who Gets The Drugs?' in July 2018.

Diana, Princess of Wales contributed significantly to National AIDS Trust in her role as patron from 1991 to 1997. National AIDS Trust was one of only six charities she formally supported at the time of her death.

National AIDS Trust is a small charity with one office found in Highgate in London, and maintains a permanent staff of fewer than 20 people, and a pool of volunteers. The current chief executive is Deborah Gold.

An important recurring role of NAT is the annual hosting of the World AIDS Day website. National AIDS Trust develops resources each year to enable other HIV organizations to maximize the impact of World AIDS Day in the UK, which is 1 December.

National AIDS Trust is an independent charity with a Board of Trustees, who are responsible for the governance and direction that the charity takes. The chair of the Board is currently Professor Jane Anderson CBE.

See also 
 HIV/AIDS in the United Kingdom
 National AIDS Trust v NHS Service Commissioning Board

References

External links
 

Health charities in the United Kingdom
HIV/AIDS organisations in the United Kingdom